Horace Cox was an important and distinct publisher of books in London, founded in the Victorian era. Cox himself died in 1918. Amongst others, the firm published Crockford's Clerical Directory, The Field and The Law Times.

References

Book publishing companies of the United Kingdom
Publishing companies established in 1866
1866 establishments in England